The Bandini 1000 GT is a road car produced in 1963 by  Bandini Cars of Forlì, Italy.

This road model, the second Bandini Gran Turismo, used the new engine, introduced in the sports cars of the same period, the (1000/62P and Saponetta 1000), detuned to increase reliability and limit interventions review. It was the first Bandini with a five-speed synchronized gearbox. The 1000 GT preserved the traditional front engine rear drive layout. The chassis benefitted from experience with the rear-engined 1000P and uses a design directly derived from the sport that precedes the same system and front and rear suspension. On the front wheels are disc brakes, while the rear drum remained.

The alloy body was designed by a coachbuilder from northern Italy, Corna, that realized a sober but sporting coupé.

The chassis

 Structure and material: frame of elliptical section tubes, special steel aeronautics derivation; patent No. 499843
 Suspension: adjustable camber and Toe
 Front: Independent, trapezes overlapped with shock hydraulic telescopic tilted and springs cylindrical helical coaxial; bar account
 Rear: independent, multi-link with lower triangulation, hydraulic telescopic shocks  tilted and springs cylindrical helical coaxial; bar Account
 Brakes:
 Service: hydraulics, front disc and rear drum
 Parking Mechanical tape, on transmission shaft
 Steering: a worm with vibration damper on shaft
 Drive: left-hand (right upon request)
 Wheels: 15" Amadori
 Fuel tank: 
 Transmission: Rear transmission shaft with central differential and halfshafts
 Weight: bare chassis 
 Weight total: 
 Speed maximum:

1000 cc engine

 Positioning: forward longitudinal, 4-cylinder in-line
 Materials and specification: double overhead camshaft, aluminium cylinder head, hemispherical combustion chambers, distribution mixed  chain and gears on bearings, block and base to five media bench in a single casting; aluminum alloy oil sump, cylinders dismantled.
 Bore: 
 Stroke: 
 Displacement: 987 cc
 Compression ratio: 9:1
 Power: 2 Weber 38DCO3 twin-choke carburetors
 Power: 94 CV @ 8000 rpm
 Lubricate: Carter with wet gear pump and filter external alloy cooler
 Cooling: forced liquid with centrifugal pump controlled by pulley and belt, cooler on the front
 Gearbox and clutch: 5 speed synchromesh + RG clutch single dry disc
 Ignition and electrical equipment: coil and distributor on the head, battery 12 V and generator

See also
 Ilario Bandini
 Bandini Cars

Bandini vehicles
Sports racing cars
1960s cars
Cars introduced in 1963